The Archdeacon of Lismore was a senior ecclesiastical officer within firstly the Diocese of Lismore until 1363; the Diocese of Waterford and Lismore from 1363 until 1838; and finally the Diocese of Cashel and Waterford, during which time it was combined with other Archdeaconries.

The archdeaconry can trace its history from Gilbert, the first known incumbent, who held the office in the first half of the thirteenth century to the last discrete incumbent Robert Scott Bradshaw Burkitt. As such he was responsible for the disciplinary supervision of the clergy and the upkeep of diocesan property within that diocese; and later, part of it.

References

 
Lists of Anglican archdeacons in Ireland
Diocese of Cashel and Ossory